Air Commodore William Helmore CBE, PhD, MS., FCS, F.R.Ae.S. (1 March 1894 – 18 December 1964) was an engineer who had a varied and distinguished career in scientific research with the Air Ministry and the Ministry of Aircraft Production during the Second World War, as a broadcaster, and for two years as Member of Parliament for Watford 1943–1945.

Early life
William Helmore was educated at Blundell's School, the Royal Military Academy at Woolwich.
Helmore served in the First World War as a gunner and then transferred to the Royal Flying Corps, as an observer and pilot. One result of this experience was his book "Cavalry of the Air". After the war he went to Christ's College at Cambridge and obtained a first class (honours) degree in mechanical sciences.

Post WWI
In 1922 Helmore was granted a permanent commission in the RAF and developed his interest in scientific research in aviation. He was also involved in the development of aerial refuelling, serving as copilot and hose handler on Sir Alan Cobham's pioneering flight from Portsmouth, England to India on 22 September 1934, also inventing the electrolytic process of forming flame or explosion traps. 
In 1931 Helmore was awarded the Groves Prize for Aeronautical Research.

Helmore retired from the R.A.F. at his own request in 1937 to devote himself to research at Cambridge, but be returned to the active list in August 1939. His appointments included Wing Commander (1 July 1935 Air Commodore (1 March 1937), Honorary Group Captain (21 May 1941) and Honorary Air Commodore.

World War II
As senior scientific adviser to the Chief of Air Staff from 1939, Helmore was chiefly concerned with defeating the night bomber. Helmore  with aeronautical engineer L.E. Baynes, nicknamed "The Baron",  worked on the development of the Helmore/GEC Turbinlite was a 2,700 million candela (2.7 Gcd) searchlight fitted in the nose of a number of experimental radar equipped Douglas Havoc night fighters by the British during the early part of World War II and around the time of The Blitz. The light was intended to be used to illuminate attacking enemy bombers for defending fighters accompanying the Havoc to then shoot down.
Unfortunately certain practical difficulties brought the idea to nothing, but much of his work was subsequently incorporated in the Leigh light, an antisubmarine aircraft searchlight, which with the aid of radar was particularly deadly to Admiral Doenitz's U-boats.

For the last four years of the war he was technical adviser to the Ministry of Aircraft Production, and was responsible for a number of other valuable inventions and, in 1942, he was selected as one of the eight members of the Brabazon Committee (which was responsible among other things for the conception of the giant Brabazon aircraft).

Helmore's contribution, to Britain's war effort was not confined to scientific research. He had earlier broadcast such events as the Schneider Trophy air races and reviews, and during the war his accounts of the RAF's work were heard frequently. His most notable commentary was when he broadcast an eye-witness account of the D-Day landings in Normandy, the first 'live', (recorded live onto transcription disc for transmission later), broadcast from over the invasion fleet on 6 June 1944, reporting overhead from an RAF Mitchell bomber.

Helmore was Conservative Member of Parliament (MP) for Watford 1943–1945.

Post war
After the war Helmore entered industry, being technical director to Castrol, a scientific consultant to ICI and director-general of the Aluminum Association.

In 1947 Helmore was invited by the Minister for Civil Aviation to become the chairman of the Brabazon Committee, to consider the certification of aircraft and approval of equipment. In addition he was the vice-chairman of a committee set up to review the licensing, recruitment and training of civil aviation personnel.

Helmore was a keen yachtsman, owning the schooner Allegro from 1929 to 1963.

Helmore married twice. His obituary in The Times records that he left two sons and three daughters of his first marriage but other reports say he had four children, Peter, Patrick, Peggy and Pamela. Peggie, his eldest daughter married Cuthbert Scott in 1942.

Patents
 
 
 
 
 
 
, Assigned to Imperial Chemical Industries Ltd
 

 
 
 

 
 
 
 
 
 

 

 
 
, Assigned to CCWakefield &Co Ltd
 
 
 
 
 
, Assigned to H.M.Hobson (Aircraft and Motor) Components Limited
 
 
, Assigned to H.M.Hobson (Aircraft and Motor) Components Limited
 

 
 
 
 
 

 
 
 
 

 

 
, Assigned to Imperial Chemical Industries Ltd
 
, Assigned to CCWakefield &Co Ltd
 
 
 
 
 
 

 
, Assigned to CCWakefield &Co Ltd

References

Obituary of Air Commodore W. Helmore, The Times, 20 January 1964 (pg. 14; Issue 55913; col C)

External links 
 
Full details of military career

1894 births
1964 deaths
Royal Artillery officers
People educated at Blundell's School
Graduates of the Royal Military Academy, Woolwich
Royal Flying Corps officers
Alumni of Christ's College, Cambridge
Conservative Party (UK) MPs for English constituencies
English aerospace engineers
UK MPs 1935–1945
Burmah-Castrol
British Army personnel of World War I